Gentianopsis virgata (commonly called "lesser fringed gentian", "narrow-leaved fringed gentian", or "smaller fringed gentian") is a biennial herbaceous species, native to eastern USA and eastern Canada.

Taxonomy
Broadly transcribed, Gentianopsis crinita (Froel.) Ma is an eastern North American species complex, containing a group of closely related taxa, including G. virgata. Further species were described in the past, but a lack of difference in nrDNA and morphology does not support their recognition. Three subspecies are currently recognized:

Gentianopsis virgata (Raf.) Holub subsp. virgata
Gentianopsis virgata subsp. victorinii (Fernald) Lammers
Gentianopsis virgata subsp. macounii (Holm) J.S. Pringle

References

virgata
Flora of North America